Zheng Keshuang, Prince of Yanping (13 August 1670 – 22 September 1707), courtesy name Shihong, art name Huitang, was the third and last ruler of the Kingdom of Tungning in Taiwan in the 17th century. He was the second son of Zheng Jing and a grandson of Koxinga (Zheng Chenggong). After surrendering to the Qing dynasty in 1683, he was ennobled as Duke of Hanjun, and lived the rest of his life in Beijing.

Biography 
His father was Zheng Jing, the king of Tungning and the eldest son of Koxinga (Zheng Chenggong), the founder of Tungning. His biological mother was Lady Huang (黃氏), Zheng Jing's concubine.

When Zheng Jing was leading a campaign against the Manchu-led Qing dynasty in China in the late 1670s, he designated his elder son, Zheng Kezang, as his heir apparent and put him in charge of Tungning's internal affairs. At the same time, he also arranged marriages between his two sons and the daughters of two of his most trusted officials: Zheng Kezang married the daughter of Chen Yonghua, while Zheng Keshuang married the daughter of Feng Xifan.

Zheng Jing returned to Tungning in 1680 from a failed campaign against the Qing Empire. In the same year, Chen Yonghua died after he was ousted from the political arena by his rivals, Feng Xifan and Liu Guoxuan (劉國軒). Zheng Jing died a year later in Chengtian Prefecture. After Zheng Jing's death, Feng Xifan allied with Liu Guoxuan, Zheng Cong (鄭聰) and others to slander Zheng Kezang in front of Queen Dowager Dong, Zheng Jing's mother. They claimed that Zheng Kezang was not Zheng Jing's biological son, and launched a coup to kill Zheng Kezang and seize power. Following the coup, a 12-year-old Zheng Keshuang was installed on the throne as the ruler of Tungning under the title "Prince of Yanping" (延平王). After his accession to the throne, Zheng Keshuang rewarded the officials who supported him in the coup by granting them nobility titles. He also gave posthumous honorary titles to his ancestors.

In 1683, the Kangxi Emperor of the Qing dynasty ordered Shi Lang to lead a naval fleet to attack and conquer Tungning. Shi Lang and his fleet defeated the Tungning forces, led by Liu Guoxuan, at the Battle of Penghu. After the battle, the Tungning royal court split into two factions, with one advocating war and the other advocating surrender. The "war" faction was led by Zheng Dexiao (鄭得瀟), Huang Liangji (黃良驥), Xiao Wu (蕭武) and Hong Gongzhu (洪拱柱), while the "surrender" faction was led by Feng Xifan and Liu Guoxuan. Zheng Keshuang heeded Feng and Liu's advice. On 5 July 1683, Feng Xifan ordered Zheng Dexiao to write a surrender document to the Qing Empire. About ten days later, Feng sent Zheng Keshuang to meet Shi Lang. On 13 August, Shi Lang entered Taiwan and received the official surrender.

Noble titles were given to the dynasts and officers of the formerly reigning House of Koxinga. Zheng Keshuang and his family were taken to the Qing imperial capital, Beijing, to meet the Kangxi Emperor. The emperor made Zheng Keshuang a member of the Plain Yellow Banner and awarded him the hereditary title Duke of Hanjun (漢軍公; lit. "the duke of Han Eight Banners"). Some former Tungning military units, such as the rattan shield troops, were inducted into the Qing military and deployed in the battle against Russian Cossacks at Albazin.

Zheng Keshuang died of illness in 1707 in Beijing at the age of 37. His younger brother, Zheng Kexue (鄭克壆), was ordered by the Qing government to bury the remains of Zheng Chenggong and Zheng Jing in Quanzhou, Fujian – the ancestral home of the House of Koxinga. Zheng Keshuang's mother, Lady Huang, tried to seek assistance from the Qing government to return their family property in Fujian to them, which was annexed by local officials, but she failed. Later, during the reign of Yongzheng Emperor, the remaining family of Zheng's was reassigned to Plain Red Banner.

Descendants 

Zheng Keshuang was survived by three sons: Zheng Anfu (鄭安福), Zheng Anlu (鄭安祿), and Zheng Ankang (鄭安康). However, all his sons died without issue; and so, Zheng Xianji (鄭咸吉), a first cousin once removed of them, was appointed as heir to Zheng Anfu. Zheng Xianji was the elder son of Zheng Ande (鄭安德) and a grandson of Zheng Keqiao (鄭克塙), and the latter was the youngest brother of Zheng Keshuang.

Zheng's descendants served as Bannermen in Beijing until 1911 when the Xinhai Revolution broke out and the Qing dynasty's fell, after which they moved back to Anhai and Nan'an in southern Fujian. They still live there to this day.

A poet Zheng Chouyu (鄭愁予; born 1933), claimed to be one of Zheng's descendants, was born in Shandong province in China. Zheng Xiaoxuan (鄭曉嵐), father of Zheng Chouyu, fought against the Japanese invaders in the Second Sino-Japanese War. Zheng Chouyu was born in Shandong in mainland China and called himself a "child of the resistance" against Japan and he became a refugee during the war, moving from place to place across China to avoid the Japanese. He moved to Taiwan in 1949 and focuses his work on building stronger ties between Taiwan and mainland China. Zheng Chouyu was born in mainland China, he identified as Chinese and he felt alienated after he was forced to move to Taiwan in 1949 which was previously under Japanese rule and felt strange and foreign to him.

In fiction 
Zheng Keshuang appears as one of the antagonists in the novel The Deer and the Cauldron by Louis Cha.

See also 
 Kingdom of Tungning
 History of Taiwan
 Shi Lang

Notes

Citations

Bibliography 

1670 births
1670s in Taiwan
1680s in Taiwan
1707 deaths
17th-century monarchs in Asia
17th-century Taiwanese people
Chinese nobility
Chinese politicians of Japanese descent
Han Chinese Plain Yellow Bannermen
Hokkien royalty
House of Koxinga
Kingdom of Tungning
Politicians from Tainan
Qing dynasty politicians
Taiwanese people of Hoklo descent
Taiwanese politicians of Japanese descent